Brandon Marcus Lofton (born November 5, 1978) is a Democratic member of the North Carolina House of Representatives. He has represented the State's 104th district (including constituents in the southwestern portion of Mecklenburg County) since 2019.

Career
Lofton won the election on November 6, 2018 from the platform of Democratic Party. He secured fifty-two percent of the vote while his closest rival incumbent Republican Andy Dulin secured forty-eight percent. He was re-elected in 2020, defeating Republican challenger Don Pomeroy.

Committee assignments

2021-2022 Session
Agriculture 
Commerce
Finance 
Judiciary IV 
Local Government

2019-2020 Session
Agriculture 
Commerce 
Finance 
Judiciary 
State and Local Government

Electoral history

2020

2018

References

Living people
1978 births
People from Charlotte, North Carolina
Politicians from Charlotte, North Carolina
University of North Carolina at Chapel Hill alumni
New York University School of Law alumni
North Carolina lawyers
20th-century African-American people
21st-century American politicians
21st-century African-American politicians
African-American state legislators in North Carolina
Democratic Party members of the North Carolina House of Representatives